Apamea taiwana is a moth of the family Noctuidae. It is found in Taiwan.

References

Moths described in 1914
Apamea (moth)
Moths of Taiwan